A hydathode is a type of pore, commonly found in angiosperms, that secretes water through pores in the epidermis or leaf margin, typically at the tip of a marginal tooth or serration. Hydathodes occur in the leaves of submerged aquatic plants such as Ranunculus fluitans as well as herbaceous plants of drier habitats such as Campanula rotundifolia. They are connected to the plant vascular system by a vascular bundle. Hydathodes are commonly seen in water lettuce, water hyacinth, rose, balsam, and many other species.

Hydathodes are made of a group of living cells with numerous intercellular spaces filled with water, but few or no chloroplasts, and represent modified bundle-ends. These cells (called epithem cells) open out into one or more sub-epidermal chambers. These, in turn, communicate with the exterior through an open water stoma or open pore. The water stoma structurally resembles an ordinary stoma, but is usually larger and has lost the power of movement. 

Hydathodes are involved in the process of guttation, in which positive xylem pressure (due to root pressure) causes liquid to exude from the pores. Some halophytes possess glandular trichomes that actively secrete salt in order to reduce the concentration of cytotoxic inorganic ions in their cytoplasm; this may lead to the formation of a white powdery substance on the surface of the leaf.
 
Hydathodes are of two types:
 passive hydathodes, formed when a leaf vein terminates in an epithem (an area of thin-walled parenchyma).
 active hydathodes, formed when epidermal cells lose water actively.

See also 
Transpiration
Vascular plants
Xylem

References

External links 
 hydathode physiology

Plant anatomy